In aeronautics, a canard is a wing configuration in which a small forewing or foreplane is placed forward of the main wing of a fixed-wing aircraft or a weapon. The term "canard" may be used to describe the aircraft itself, the wing configuration, or the foreplane. Canard wings are also extensively used in guided missiles and smart bombs.

The term "canard" arose from the appearance of the Santos-Dumont 14-bis of 1906, which was said to be reminiscent of a duck (canard in French) with its neck stretched out in flight.

Despite the use of a canard surface on the first powered aeroplane, the Wright Flyer of 1903, canard designs were not built in quantity until the appearance of the Saab Viggen jet fighter in 1967. The aerodynamics of the canard configuration are complex and require careful analysis.

Rather than use the conventional tailplane configuration found on most aircraft, an aircraft designer may adopt the canard configuration to reduce the main wing loading, to better control the main wing airflow, or to increase the aircraft's maneuverability, especially at high angles of attack or during a stall. Canard foreplanes, whether used in a canard or three-surface configuration, have important consequences for the aircraft's longitudinal equilibrium, static and dynamic stability characteristics.

History

Pioneer years

The Wright Brothers began experimenting with the foreplane configuration around 1900. Their first kite included a front surface for pitch control and they adopted this configuration for their first Flyer. They were suspicious of the aft tail because Otto Lilienthal had been killed in a glider with one. The Wrights realised that a foreplane would tend to destabilise an aeroplane but expected it to be a better control surface, in addition to being visible to the pilot in flight. They believed it impossible to provide both control and stability in a single design, and opted for control.

Many pioneers initially followed the Wrights' lead. For example, the Santos-Dumont 14-bis aeroplane of 1906 had no "tail", but a box kite-like set of control surfaces in the front, pivoting on a universal joint on the fuselage's extreme nose, making it capable of incorporating both yaw and pitch control. The Fabre Hydravion of 1910 was the first floatplane to fly and had a foreplane.

But canard behaviour was not properly understood and other European pioneers—among them, Louis Blériot—were establishing the tailplane as the safer and more "conventional" design. Some, including the Wrights, experimented with both fore and aft planes on the same aircraft, now known as the three surface configuration.

After 1911, few canard types would be produced for many decades. In 1914 W.E. Evans commented that "the Canard type model has practically received its death-blow so far as scientific models are concerned."

1914 to 1945

Experiments continued sporadically for several decades.

In 1917 de Bruyère constructed his C 1 biplane fighter, having a canard foreplane and rear-mounted pusher propeller. The C 1 was a failure. 

First flown in 1927, the experimental Focke-Wulf F 19 "Ente" (duck) was more successful.  Two examples were built and one of them continued flying until 1931.

Immediately before and during World War II, several experimental canard fighters were flown, including the Ambrosini SS.4, Curtiss-Wright XP-55 Ascender and Kyūshū J7W1 Shinden. These were attempts at using the canard configuration to give advantages in areas such as performance, armament disposition or pilot view. Ultimately, no production aircraft were completed. The Shinden was ordered into production "off the drawing board" but only prototypes had flown by the time the war ended.

In 1945 in Europe, what may have been the first canard designed and flown in the Soviet Union appeared as a test aircraft, the experimental Mikoyan-Gurevich MiG-8 Utka (Russian for "duck"), a lightweight propeller aircraft. It was noted for its docile slow-speed handling characteristics and flew for some years, being used as a testbed during development of the swept wing of the (conventional layout) MiG-15 jet fighter.

Canard revival

With the arrival of the jet age and supersonic flight, American designers, notably North American Aviation, began to experiment with supersonic canard delta designs, with some such as the North American XB-70 Valkyrie and the Soviet equivalent Sukhoi T-4 flying in prototype form. But the stability and control problems encountered prevented widespread adoption.

In 1963 the Swedish company Saab patented a delta-winged design which overcame the earlier problems, in what has become known as the close-coupled canard. It was built as the Saab 37 Viggen and in 1967 became the first modern canard aircraft to enter production. The success of this aircraft spurred many designers, and canard surfaces sprouted on a number of types derived from the popular Dassault Mirage delta-winged jet fighter. These included variants of the French Dassault Mirage III, Israeli IAI Kfir and South African Atlas Cheetah. The close-coupled canard delta remains a popular configuration for combat aircraft.

The Viggen also inspired the American Burt Rutan to create a two-seater homebuilt canard delta design, accordingly named VariViggen and flown in 1972. Rutan then abandoned the delta wing as unsuited to such light aircraft. His next two canard designs, the VariEze and Long-EZ had longer-span swept wings. These designs were not only successful and built in large numbers but were radically different from anything seen before. Rutan's ideas soon spread to other designers. From the 1980s they found favour in the executive market with the appearance of types such as the OMAC Laser 300, Avtek 400 and Beech Starship.

Computer control

Static canard designs can have complex interactions in airflow between the canard and the main wing, leading to issues with stability and behaviour in the stall. This limits their applicability. The development of fly-by-wire and artificial stability towards the end of the century opened the way for computerized controls to begin turning these complex effects from stability concerns into maneuverability advantages.

This approach produced a new generation of military canard designs.  The Dassault Rafale multirole fighter first flew in 1986, followed by the Saab Gripen (first to enter service) in 1988, and the Eurofighter Typhoon in 1994. These three types and related design studies are sometimes referred to as the euro-canards or eurocanards. The Chinese Chengdu J-10 appeared in 1998.

Basic design principles 

A canard foreplane may be used for various reasons such as lift, (in)stability, trim, flight control, or to modify airflow over the main wing.  Design analysis has been divided into two main classes, for the lifting-canard and the control-canard. These classes may follow the close-coupled type or not, and a given design may provide either or both of lift and control.

Lift

In the lifting-canard configuration, the weight of the aircraft is shared between the wing and the canard. It has been described as an extreme conventional configuration but with a small highly loaded wing and an enormous lifting tail which enables the centre of mass to be very far aft relative to the front surface.

A lifting canard generates an upload, in contrast to a conventional aft-tail which sometimes generates negative lift that must be counteracted by extra lift on the main wing. As the canard lift adds to the overall lift capability of the aircraft, this may appear to favor the canard layout. In particular, at takeoff the wing is most heavily loaded and where a conventional tail exerts a downforce worsening the load, a canard exerts an upward force relieving the load. This allows a smaller main wing.
  
However, the foreplane also creates a downwash which can affect the wing lift distribution unfavorably, so the differences in overall lift and induced drag are not obvious and they depend on the details of the design.

A danger associated with an insufficiently loaded canard—i.e. when the center of gravity is too far aft—is that when approaching stall, the main wing may stall first. This causes the rear of the craft to drop, deepening the stall and sometimes preventing recovery.  To ensure safe pitch stability in the stall, the canard must stall first, so the wing must always stay below its maximum lift capability.  Hence, the wing must be larger than otherwise necessary, reducing or even reversing the reduction in size enabled by the canard lift.

With a lifting-canard type, the main wing must be located further aft of the center of gravity than a conventional wing, and this increases the downward pitching moment caused by the deflection of trailing-edge flaps. Highly loaded canards do not have sufficient extra lift available to balance this moment, so lifting-canard aircraft cannot readily be designed with powerful trailing-edge flaps.

Control

Pitch control in a canard type may be achieved either by the canard surface, as on the control-canard or in the same way as a tailless aircraft, by control surfaces at the rear of the main wing, as on the Saab Viggen.

In a control-canard design, most of the weight of the aircraft is carried by the wing and the canard is used primarily for pitch control during maneuvering. A pure control-canard operates only as a control surface and is nominally at zero angle of attack and carrying no load in normal flight. Modern combat aircraft of canard configuration typically have a control-canard driven by a computerized flight control system.

Canards with little or no loading (i.e. control-canards) may be used to intentionally destabilize some combat aircraft in order to make them more manoeuvrable. The electronic flight control system uses the pitch control function of the canard foreplane to create artificial static and dynamic stability.

A benefit obtainable from a control-canard is the correction of pitch-up during a wingtip stall.  An all-moving canard capable of a significant nose-down deflection can be used to counteract the pitch-up due to the tip stall.  As a result, the aspect ratio and sweep of the wing can be optimized without having to guard against pitch-up. A highly loaded lifting canard does not have sufficient spare lift capacity to provide this protection.

Stability

A canard foreplane may be used as a horizontal stabiliser, whether stability is achieved statically or artificially (fly-by-wire).

Being placed ahead of the center of gravity, a canard foreplane acts directly to reduce longitudinal static stability (stability in pitch). The first airplane to achieve controlled, powered flight, the Wright Flyer, was conceived as a control-canard but in effect was also an unstable lifting canard. At that time the Wright brothers did not understand the basics of pitch stability of the canard configuration, and were in any event more concerned with controllability.

Nevertheless, a canard stabiliser may be added to an otherwise unstable design to obtain overall static pitch stability. To achieve this stability, the change in canard lift coefficient with angle of attack (lift coefficient slope) should be less than that for the main plane. A number of factors affect this characteristic.

For most airfoils, lift slope decreases at high lift coefficients. Therefore, the most common way in which pitch stability can be achieved is to increase the lift coefficient (so the wing loading) of the canard. This tends to increase the lift-induced drag of the foreplane, which may be given a high aspect ratio in order to limit drag. Such a canard airfoil has a greater airfoil camber than the wing.

Another possibility is to decrease the aspect ratio of the canard, with again more lift-induced drag and possibly a higher stall angle than the wing.

A design approach used by Burt Rutan is a high aspect ratio canard with higher lift coefficient (the wing loading of the canard is between 1.6 and 2 times the wing one) and a canard airfoil whose lift coefficient slope is non-linear (nearly flat) between 14° and 24°.

Another stabilisation parameter is the power effect. In case of canard pusher propeller: "the power-induced flow clean up of the wing trailing edge"  increases the wing lift coefficient slope (see above). Conversely, a propeller located ahead of the canard (increasing the lift slope of the canard) has a strong destabilising effect.

Trim

A highly loaded lifting canard may not have sufficient spare lifting capacity to accommodate large movements of the centre of pressure or of the centre of gravity. Trim may be accomplished in similar manner to a tailless craft, by adjustment of trailing-edge surfaces. In particular, the use of landing flaps on the main wing causes a large trim change. The Saab Viggen has flaps on the canard surface which were deployed simultaneously to cancel out the change in trim. The Beech Starship uses variable-sweep foreplanes to trim the position of the lift force.

When the main wing is most loaded, at takeoff, to rotate the nose up a conventional tailplane typically pushes down while a foreplane lifts up. In order to maintain trim the main wing on a canard design must therefore be located further aft relative to the centre of gravity than on the equivalent conventional design.

Variations

Close coupling
A close-coupled canard has been shown to benefit a supersonic delta wing design which gains lift in both transonic flight (such as for supercruise) and also in low speed flight (such as take offs and landings).
In the close-coupled delta wing canard, the foreplane is located just above and forward of the wing. The vortices generated by a delta-shaped foreplane flow back past the main wing and interact with its own vortices. Because these are critical for lift, a badly-placed foreplane can cause severe problems. By bringing the foreplane close to the wing and just above it in a close-coupled arrangement, the interactions can be made beneficial, actually helping to solve other problems too. For example, at high angles of attack (and therefore typically at low speeds) the canard surface directs airflow downward over the wing, reducing turbulence which results in reduced drag and increased lift. Typically the foreplane creates a vortex which attaches to the upper surface of the wing, stabilising and re-energising the airflow over the wing and delaying or preventing the stall.

The canard foreplane may be fixed as on the IAI Kfir, have landing flaps as on the Saab Viggen, or be moveable and also act as a control-canard during normal flight as on the Dassault Rafale.

Free-floating canard
A free-floating canard is designed to change its angle of incidence to the fuselage without pilot input. In normal flight, the air pressure distribution maintains its angle of attack to the airflow, and therefore also the lift coefficient it generates, to a constant amount. A free-floating mechanism may increase static stability and provide safe recovery from high angle of attack evolutions. However, it negatively affects stall characteristics, since the main wing may stall before the canard. Control surfaces may be added to the free-floating canard, allowing pilot input to affect the generated lift, thus providing pitch control or trim adjustment.

Variable geometry

The Beechcraft Starship has a variable sweep canard surface. The sweep is varied in flight by swinging the foreplanes forward to increase their effectiveness and so trim out the nose-down pitching effect caused by the wing flaps when deployed.

A moustache is a small, high aspect ratio foreplane which is deployed for low-speed flight in order to improve handling at high angles of attack such as during takeoff and landing. It is retracted at high speed in order to avoid the wave drag penalty of a canard design. It was first seen on the Dassault Milan and later on the Tupolev Tu-144. NASA has also investigated a one-piece slewed equivalent called the conformably stowable canard, where as the surface is stowed one side sweeps backwards and the other forwards.

Ride control

The Rockwell B-1 Lancer has small canard vanes or fins on either side of the forward fuselage that form part of an active damping system that reduces aerodynamic buffeting during high-speed, low altitude flight. Such buffeting would otherwise cause crew fatigue and reduce airframe life during prolonged flights.

Stealth
Canard aircraft can potentially have poor stealth characteristics because they present large angular surfaces that tend to reflect radar signals forwards.  The Eurofighter Typhoon uses software control of its canards in order to reduce its effective radar cross section.

Canards have been incorporated on stealth aircraft such as Lockheed Martin's Joint Advanced Strike Technology (JAST) program and McDonnell Douglas / NASA's X-36 research prototype.

See also
 List of canard aircraft
 Tandem wing
 Rotorcraft

References

Citations

Bibliography
 .
 .
 .

Further reading
 .
 .
 .
 .

External links

Aircraft components
Wing configurations
 
Aircraft wing design